Tony Wallace (born 22 February 1991 in Glasgow) is a Scottish footballer who plays as a midfielder for Annan Athletic.

He began his senior career with Dumbarton, then signed for Greenock Morton, although he spent the end of 2013–14 on loan at Queen's Park. In 2014, he signed for Lowland Football League side BSC Glasgow, and then moved to Highland Football League outfit Nairn County in July 2015. He also had single season spells with  East Fife, East Kilbride and Annan Athletic.

Career

Dumbarton
Wallace was a bit part player during his two seasons with the first team at Dumbarton, coming to the fore in their victory in the play-offs to win promotion to the Scottish First Division.

This performance earned him a move to full-time First Division side Greenock Morton for a nominal fee.

Greenock Morton
Wallace scored on his début for Morton in a Challenge Cup first round tie against Albion Rovers.

In February 2014, Wallace went on loan to Queen's Park for a month. After his loan spell, he returned to Morton for one start before being sent back on loan to Queen's Park until the end of the season. He left Morton in the summer of 2014.

Lowland and Highland Leagues
After leaving Morton, Wallace joined newly-formed BSC Glasgow competing in the Lowland Football League. He left BSC after winning the SFA Challenge Cup in his only season at the club.

On 18 July 2015, Wallace moved to Highland Football League club Nairn County, signing a one-year contract.

Return to senior football
In June 2016, Wallace returned to the SPFL, signing for Scottish League One side East Fife. He was released by East Fife after one season with the side.

Later career
Wallace joined Lowland Football League side East Kilbride in November 2017. After a season Wallace returned to the SPFL with Annan Athletic and scored his first goal for them in the Scottish Challenge Cup against Celtic U21.

On 26 May 2019, Wallace moved to Clyde, signing a two-year contract. He returned to Annan Athletc in March 2021.

Honours

References

External links
 (Dumbarton)
 (Morton)

1991 births
Living people
Scottish footballers
Dumbarton F.C. players
Greenock Morton F.C. players
Queen's Park F.C. players
Broomhill F.C. (Scotland) players
Nairn County F.C. players
East Fife F.C. players
Scottish Football League players
Association football midfielders
Association football defenders
Footballers from Glasgow
Scotland youth international footballers
Scottish Professional Football League players
Lowland Football League players
Annan Athletic F.C. players
East Kilbride F.C. players
Clyde F.C. players